King's Highway 407, commonly referred to as Highway 407 and colloquially as the "four-oh-seven", is a tolled 400-series highway in the Canadian province of Ontario. Comprising a privately leased segment as well as a publicly owned segment, the route spans the entire Greater Toronto Area (GTA) around the city of Toronto, travelling through the suburbs of Burlington, Oakville, Mississauga, Brampton, Vaughan, Markham, Pickering, Whitby, and Oshawa before ending in Clarington, north of Orono. At 151.4 km long, this is the fourth longest freeway in Ontario's 400 series network, after Highways 417, 400, and 401. The segment between Burlington and Brougham in Pickering is leased to and operated by the 407 ETR Concession Company Limited and is officially known as the 407 Express Toll Route (407 ETR). The route interchanges with nine freeways: the QEW, Highway 403, Highway 401, Highway 410, Highway 427, Highway 400, Highway 404, Highway 412, and Highway 418. Highway 407 is an electronically operated toll highway; there are no toll booths along the length of the route. Distances are calculated automatically using transponders or automatic number-plate recognition, which are scanned at entrance and exit portals.

Highway 407 was planned in the late 1950s as a freeway bypassing the Toronto segment of Highway 401, the busiest highway in North America.
However, construction did not begin until 1987. During the early 1990s, the provincial government proposed tolling the highway to alleviate a revenue shortfall. The central sections of Highway 407 opened in 1997, and the remaining sections were built quickly over the following four years, with the final segment opening in mid-2001.
Despite being included in the 400-series network, the Highway 407 ETR section is not considered part of the provincial highway network due to it now being privately operated.
The segment is operated privately under a 99-year lease agreement with the provincial government, which was sold in 1999 for about C$3.1 billion to a consortium of Canadian and Spanish investors operating under the name 407 International Inc.
The privatization of the Highway 407 ETR section has been the source of significant criticism, especially regarding the increases in tolls, plate denial, and false charges. In addition, the safety of segments constructed following the sale of the freeway has been called into question.

Phase 1 of a provincially owned and tolled extension of the route, known solely as Highway 407 (and not as Highway 407 ETR), opened to traffic from Brock Road in Pickering to Harmony Road in Oshawa on June 20, 2016. Included as part of this extension was construction of a tolled north–south link between Highways 401 and 407 known as Highway 412. Phase 2 later extended the provincially owned portion of Highway 407 to Highway 35 / Highway 115 in  Clarington. This construction was completed in two stages, with Phase 2A opening on January 2, 2018, as a  extension to Taunton Road, and Phase 2B opening on December 9, 2019, as a  extension to Highway 35 and Highway 115. Included as part of this extension was construction of another tolled north–south link between Highways 401 and 407 known as Highway 418.

Unusually, the highway does not reach or pass through any of its three control cities: Hamilton, Toronto, or Peterborough. Hamilton is accessed by following either the QEW or Highway 403 beyond its western terminus in Burlington. Toronto proper is bypassed, but is used as a control city due to the similar sizes of the suburban municipalities the highway passes through in Halton and Durham Regions. In the east, Peterborough is reached by briefly following the Highway 35/Highway 115 concurrency north, and then continuing northeast on Highway 115 alone.

Route description 

Highway 407 is a  controlled-access highway that encircles the GTA, passing through Burlington, Oakville, Mississauga, Brampton, Vaughan, Markham, Pickering, Whitby, Oshawa, and Clarington, as well as travelling immediately north of Toronto.
Although the general public felt that tolling made the highway a luxury rather than its original purpose of relieving traffic on Highway 401, Highway 407 ETR has had average daily trip counts of over 350,000 vehicles in June 2014.
The 407 ETR is contractually responsible for maintaining high traffic levels as justification for increasing tolls, but conduct their own traffic studies. Despite increased usage, parallel roads that Highway 407 was intended to supplement continue to grow congested, forcing the MTO to revisit costly widening projects of Highway 401 and the QEW.

Highway 407 has been designed with aesthetics and environmental concerns in mind by featuring landscaped embankments, 79 storm drainage ponds, as well as a curb and gutter system.
Unlike most other Ontario highways, it features concrete pavement as opposed to top-coated asphalt. Because of this, the high-mast lighting along the urban portions of the route feature fewer luminaires than asphalt-surfaced freeways.

Burlington–Vaughan 
Highway 407 begins in Burlington within Halton Region at the Freeman Interchange between Highway 403 and the QEW, from which it branches off northward. The six-lane route passes under Brant Street, Upper Middle Road, and Guelph Line (Halton Regional Road 1) before it interchanges with Dundas Street (Halton Regional Road 5, formerly Highway 5). It briefly enters greenspace as it curves gently to the northeast, avoiding the nearby Niagara Escarpment. The route is crossed by Walkers Line, east of which residential subdivisions line the south side and green space lines the north. At an interchange with Appleby Line (Halton Regional Road 20), the highway straightens and travels parallel to Dundas Street before passing over Bronte Creek and under the Canadian National Railway's (CN) Halwest Subdivision.

East of Bronte Creek, Highway 407 enters an agricultural area, interspersed with woodlots. It enters Oakville at the Tremaine Road (Halton Regional Road 22) overpass, then gradually swerves to the north as it encounters an interchange with Bronte Road (Halton Regional Road 25, formerly Highway 25). The route crosses Sixteen Mile Creek just north of Glenarchy Conservation Area, then travels parallel to the creek for several kilometres. It swerves north after an interchange with Neyagawa Boulevard, near the hamlet of Glenarchy. After diverging from the creek, it curves northeast, parallel to and north of Burnhamthorpe Road, where it interchanges with Trafalgar Road (Halton Regional Road 3). Highway 407 then encounters Highway 403, where it curves sharply to the northwest, while Highway 403 curves from the southeast to the northeast; resulting in both highways meeting and deflecting at a 90° angle and not crossing each other.

Now travelling parallel to and immediately west of the Halton–Peel regional boundary and Oakville–Mississauga city limits, the six-lane Highway 407 progresses northwest alongside a power transmission corridor, with residential areas to the east and farmland to the west. The route continues as such northwest to Highway 401, passing under Lower Base Line and Eglinton Avenue and interchanging at Britannia Road and Derry Road before crossing the Canadian Pacific Railway's (CP) Galt Subdivision. At Highway 401, the route makes a sharp curve to the northeast, while interconnecting ramps weave across both freeways over several kilometres. It enters Peel Region at the Winston Churchill Boulevard (Peel Regional Road 19) overpass and follows another power transmission corridor just north of the Brampton–Mississauga boundary.

Highway 407 swerves east and encounters an interchange with Mississauga Road (Peel Regional Road 1) just prior to crossing the Credit River and the Orangeville Brampton Railway, after which it enters the urban GTA. After passing interchanges with Mavis Road (Peel Regional Road 18) and Hurontario Street (formerly Highway 10), the route encounters Highway 410 at another sprawling interchange located over Etobicoke Creek. Over the next , the route nudges northward into Brampton, interchanging with Dixie Road (Peel Regional Road 4) and Bramalea Road and meeting another CN railway line, before crossing Steeles Avenue (Peel Regional Road 15). Highway 407 curves back to the northeast as it interchanges with Airport Road (Peel Regional Road 7) and passes beneath another CN line, before encountering the final interchange in Peel Region at Goreway Drive. It crosses the West Humber River and former Highway 50 in Claireville Conservation Area before curving east into Vaughan, in York Region.

Vaughan–Pickering 

Immediately after crossing into Vaughan, Highway 407 encounters the first of three large interchanges with other 400-series highways in York Region. The Highway 427 interchange is a four-level partial stack located just north of Steeles Avenue in Vaughan and adjacent to the 407 ETR Concession Company offices. The interchange features weaved ramps which connect to former Highway 27, located just to the east. The route continues eastward, parallel to and between Steeles Avenue and Highway 7. It dives through the Humber River valley alongside a CN line and along the northern border of Thackeray Conservation Lands, passing beneath a CP line. After an interchange with Pine Valley Drive (York Regional Road 57), the route becomes sandwiched between the industrial lands of the Pine Valley Business Park and the Emery Creek Corporate Park. A partial interchange with Weston Road (York Regional Road 56) lies just west of the large four-level stack interchange with Highway 400, the only of its kind in Canada. An interchange with Jane Street (York Regional Road 55) is interwoven into the east side of the Highway 400 interchange, below which pass the tunnels of the Line 1 Yonge–University subway, with the Highway 407 station (with its large commuter parking lot and GO Transit bus terminal serving the highway corridor) located to the south.

Still travelling alongside a power transmission corridor, Highway 407 crosses a complex rail wye which provides access to the CN freight yards to the north. After interchanging with Keele Street (York Regional Road 6), the route gently curves northward, passing under the CN Newmarket Subdivision, which carries the GO Transit Barrie Line and crossing the Don River. It curves back eastward as it interchanges with Dufferin Street (York Regional Road 53), travelling adjacent to and south of Highway 7. After interchanges with Bathurst Street (York Regional Road 38) and Yonge Street (York Regional Road 1), Highway 407 crosses the CN Bala Subdivision, which carries the GO Transit Richmond Hill Line. After an interchange with Bayview Avenue (York Regional Road 34), the highway swerves south and enters Markham. A partial interchange with Leslie Street (York Regional Road 12) precedes the third and final large freeway–freeway junction at Highway 404.

East of Highway 404, the freeway travels generally parallel to the Rouge River. It interchanges with Woodbine Avenue (York Regional Road 8) and Warden Avenue (York Regional Road 65), east of which the route travels alongside a CN line and crosses the GO Transit Unionville Line. Highway 407 continues straight eastward into a residential area, interchanging with Kennedy Road (York Regional Road 3), McCowan Road (York Regional Road 67), and Markham Road (York Regional Road 68), where it crosses the river and diverges from both the CN line and power transmission corridor. The route interchanges with Ninth Line (York Regional Road 69) and Donald Cousens Parkway (York Regional Road 48) before exiting the urban GTA and curving northeast over a CP line and into Rouge Park.

Until the opening of the first phase of 407E in June 2016, the final interchange along Highway 407 was with York–Durham Line (York/Durham Regional Road 30), the boundary between York Region and Durham Region as well as Markham and Pickering.

The route curves eastward, then crosses West Duffins Creek north of the community of Whitevale, south of the future Pickering Airport and the planned community of Seaton. Sandwiched between farm fields, the highway is crossed by North Road, before interchanging with Whites Road (formerly Sideline 26), an interchange which opened in February 2021.
Highway 407 ended just south of Brougham at a signalized intersection with Brock Road (Durham Regional Road 1) until the end of 2015, where it continued eastward as Highway 7. A new interchange has been built in conjunction with the provincially maintained and tolled extension, Highway 407E, which was constructed east of this point, and ties in with the current freeway, eliminating the at-grade intersection.

Pickering–Clarington 

Immediately east of Brock Road, drivers enter the provincially operated portion of the highway. Right before Brock Road, the freeway turns northeast. After interchanging with Brock Road, the freeway is crossed by Highway 7 and Sideline 14 before it slowly eases due east. The freeway is flanked by farmland is then crossed by Westney Road, Salem Road, where there is a maintenance depot, and Kinsale Road, before interchanging with Lake Ridge Road, which forms the border between Pickering and Whitby. Immediately east of Lake Ridge Road, the freeway meets with Highway 412 at a large Y-interchange.

Highway 407 then curves southeast to bypass the town of Brooklin. It is crossed by Highway 7 once again before interchanging with Highway 12/Baldwin Street and Thickson Road. The freeway becomes parallel with a hydro line briefly. The freeway once again curves northeast, crossing the Whitby/Oshawa border, passing over Thornton Road and Winchester Road before interchanging with Simcoe Street and Harmony Road. The freeway then curves sharply southeast, crossing under the hydro lines it was just parallel to, crossing Winchester Street for the last time, and crossing the Oshawa/Clarington border. The freeway then is crossed by Langmaid Road and Concession Road 6 before turning due east and interchanging with Enfield Road. The freeway passes south of the hamlet of Solina before meeting Highway 418 at another large Y-interchange.

Highway 407 then jogs north of the hamlet of Hampton before interchanging with Bowmanville Avenue. The freeway is crossed by Middle Road, Liberty Street, and Betheseda Road before it turns slightly northeast. The freeway interchanges with Darlington-Clarke Townline with a B4 Parclo interchange, which is the last interchange on the freeway. The freeway then crosses Leskard Road and Best Road, before ending at Highway 35/115 with a modified trumpet interchange.

Both Phase 1 of the 407 East Extension, as far as Harmony Road in Oshawa and Highway 412 opened to traffic on June 20, 2016. Phase 2A of the 407 East Extension, as far as Taunton Road in Clarington opened to traffic on January 2, 2018. Both Phase 2B of the 407 East Extension, as far as Highway 35 and Highway 115 in Clarington and Highway 418 opened to traffic on December 9, 2019.

Tolls 

Unlike most other toll highways, Highway 407 features no toll booths. Rather, a system of cameras and transponders allows for automatic toll collection. It is one of the earliest examples of a highway to exclusively use open road tolling. Highway 407 is otherwise designed as a normal freeway; interchanges connect directly to crossroads. A radio antenna detects when a vehicle with a transponder has entered and exited the highway, calculating the toll rate. For vehicles without a transponder, an automatic license plate recognition system is used. In both cases, monthly statements are mailed to users. The automatic plate recognition system is linked to several provincial and U.S. state motor vehicle registries.
Toll rates are set by both the 407 ETR and the Province of Ontario for each of the respective sections they own. However, the province set out limitations in the 407 ETR lease contract for maintaining traffic volumes to justify toll rates. Despite this, rates have increased annually against the requests of the provincial government, resulting in several court battles and the general public regarding the route as a luxury.

Plate denial 
As part of the contractual agreement with the government, the MTO is required to deny licence plate validation stickers to drivers who have an outstanding 407 ETR bill over 125 days past due.
This process was temporarily halted in February 2000 due to numerous false billing claims. Following a judicial decision by the Ontario Divisional Court on November 7, 2005, the Ontario Registrar of Motor Vehicles was ordered to begin denying the validation or issue of Ontario licence plates and vehicle permits for 407 ETR users who have failed to pay owed fees. On November 22, 2005, the MTO announced that it would appeal the decision but would begin to deny plates until the appeal was decided. On February 24, 2006, the Ontario Court of Appeals denied the government leave to appeal the 2005 decision. As a result, plate denial remains in place.

Rates 
Users of both 407 ETR and Highways 407E/412/418 only receive one bill invoice, with trips on each highway specified. 
407 ETR Transponders are compatible with Highways 407E, 412, 418.

407 ETR 
All dollar amounts listed are Canadian dollars. EB = eastbound, WB = westbound
The rate rose for tolls in 2019 and again in 2020.
On December 31, 2019, it was announced that the highway would have seasonal toll rates.

As of February 1, 2020, the base tolls for driving on the 407 ETR are as follows:

Starting February 1, 2018, there are 4 zones: 1 from QEW/403 to 401, 2 from 401 to 427, 3 from 427 to 404 and 4 from 404 to 407E (Brock Rd.)
The toll rate that applies to a specific trip is determined by the time at which a vehicle enters the highway.
Off peak rates are in effect from 19:00 - 06:00 Monday to Friday except public holidays, and 19:00 - 11:00 Saturday, Sunday and holidays.
Midday weekday rates are in effect from 10:00 - 14:30, Mondays to Fridays except for holidays.
Midday weekend/holiday rates are in effect from 11:00 - 19:00, Saturday, Sunday and holidays.
Peak period rates are in effect from 06:00 - 07:00, 09:00 - 10:00, 14:30 - 15:30 and from 18:00 - 19:00, Monday to Friday except for public holidays.
Peak hours rates are in effect from 07:00 - 09:00 and from 15:30 - 18:00, Mondays to Fridays except for public holidays.
Heavy goods vehicles and lorries are assessed a minimum toll regardless of the length of their trip.
 * Light goods vehicles without transponders are assessed an additional Video Toll. Motorcycles are not charged a video toll because there is rarely a suitable place to mount a transponder.
 ** Heavy duty vehicles are legally required to have transponders in order to use the highway; offenders may be penalized under the Highway Traffic Act.

Provincially operated section

To compensate for opening delays, tolling of both the Highway 407 extension and Highway 412 did not commence until February 2017. The tolls also applied to Highway 418 when first opened in December 2019.  
On April 5, 2022, Highways 412 and 418 became toll-free, however the tolls on the 407 East Extension remained. 
As of June 1, 2019, the following tolls applies for motorists utilizing this section of the 407. The rate stayed the same in 2018 and rose in 2019.:

All end times displayed are rounded up to the nearest minute for simplicity purposes (i.e. 6am is actually 5:59:59am) 
The toll rate that applies to a specific trip is determined by the time at which a vehicle enters the highway.    
Heavy goods vehicles and lorries are assessed a minimum toll regardless of the length of their trip: $3.00 off peak, $5.00 during peak hours. 
As seen above, the costs of utilizing these provincially owned tollways are less than that of the 407 ETR.
Light vehicles without transponders may be assessed an additional Video Toll.
Vehicles weighing over 5,000 kilograms are divided into two categories: Heavy Single Units and Heavy Multiple Units. Heavy Multiple Unit Vehicles will be charged two or three time the passenger rate, depending on the size of the vehicle.
All Heavy Unit vehicles are legally required to have transponders in order to use the highways; offenders may be penalized under the Highway Traffic Act.

Financial

Lease Ownership 
As of August 2022 and unchanged since 2019, ownership of the 407 ETR Concession Company Limited ("407 ETR"), the operator/manager of the highway, is as follows:
 Indirectly owned subsidiaries of Canada Pension Plan Investment Board 50.01%
 Cintra Global S.E., a subsidiary of Spanish firm Ferrovial S.A. 43.23%
 SNC Lavalin 6.76%

Revenue and Profit 
The concession has been called a "cash cow" for SNC-Lavalin, while local media has commented on the "huge jump" or "soar" in profits.

Market Valuation 
Initial construction cost was pegged at 1.5 billion. The toll concession was sold for $3.1 billion.

In 1998, MPP E. J. Douglas Rollins claimed that the province had as much as $104 billion invested in the highway.

On October 5, 2010, the Canadian Pension Plan announced that an agreement was reached with the owners of the roadway to purchase 10% stake for $894 million.
This implied a value of close to $9 billion for the highway in its then-current state.

In April 2019, SNC-Lavalin Group Inc. announced the sale of 10.01% of the highway to the Ontario Municipal Employees Retirement System (OMERS) for $3.25 billion, implying a $32.5 billion valuation of the entire highway. After the sale, the company would own only 6.76% of the highway. In August 2019, a court cleared the sale of the 10% SNC stake to CPPIB instead of OMERS.

History

Planning and initial construction 
Although construction of Highway 407 did not begin until 1987, planning for the bypass of Highway 401 north of Toronto began in the late-1950s. Concepts for the new "dual highway" first appeared in the 1959 plan for Metropolitan Toronto.
Land adjacent to several hydro corridors was acquired for the future freeway in the 1960s, but sat vacant as the Ontario Department of Highway (predecessor to the Ministry of Transportation of Ontario (MTO)) opted instead to widen Highway 401 to a twelve-lane collector-express system. The Highway 401 expansion project was considered a success and construction of Highway 407 was shelved for almost thirty years. The plan was revisited in the mid-1980s as congestion in Toronto pushed roads beyond capacity. In 1986, Premier David Peterson was given a helicopter tour of the city during rush-hour; construction of the highway was announced soon thereafter, and began in 1987.

The Ontario government's normal process for highway construction was not possible given the financial constraints of the recession of the early 1990s. The Peterson government sought out private sector partnerships and acquired innovative electronic tolling technology. Two firms bid on the project, with the Canadian Highways International Corporation being selected as the operator of the highway.
Financing for the highway was to be paid by user tolls lasting 35 years, after which it would return to the provincial system as a toll-free 400-series highway.
The succeeding government of Bob Rae announced on March 31, 1995, that the corridor reserved for Highway 403 between Burlington and Oakville would instead be built as a western extension of Highway 407.

The first segment of Highway 407, between Highway 410 and Highway 404, was ceremonially opened to traffic on June 7, 1997; no tolls were charged for a month to allow motorists to test-drive the freeway. Several other sections were well underway at this point. A  extension westwards to Highway 401 was opened just months later on December 13, 1997.
That section was connected with Highway 403 to the south on September 4, 1998,
with a temporary two lane ramp connecting to Trafalgar Road.
In the east, an extension to Markham Road, at what was then the southern terminus of Highway 48, was completed in early 1998. However, due to the protest of local residents and officials concerning traffic spill-off (a scenario revisited with the extension to Oshawa), the freeway was opened only as far as McCowan Road on February 18.
The short segment from McCowan Road to Markham Road remained closed for over a year, as locals feared the funneling of traffic onto Main Street, which is named Markham Road south of the freeway. Both Markham and McCowan were widened to four lanes between Highway 407 and Steeles Avenue at this time. This did not alleviate concerns, but on June 24, 1999, the extension opened to continued protest regardless.

In 2000, the 407 consortium had planned to extend the four lane highway by 16 kilometres eastward from Markham to Brock Road in Pickering by the end of the following year. 

The 16 kilometre segment of Highway 407 from Markham to Brock Road in Pickering opened on August 24, 2001.

Privatization and original extensions 

When Mike Harris was elected Premier in 1995 on his platform of the Common Sense Revolution, the Ontario government faced an $11 billion annual deficit and a $100 billion debt. Seeking to balance the books, a number of publicly owned services were privatized over the following years. Although initially spared, Highway 407 was sold quickly in the year leading up to the 1999 provincial elections. The highway was leased to a conglomerate of private companies for $3.1 billion. The Ontario corporation, known as 407 International Inc., was initially owned by the Spanish multinational Cintra Infraestructuras (43.23%), as well as various subsidiaries of the Canada Pension Plan Investment Board (40%) and the Montreal-based engineering firm SNC-Lavalin (16.77%).
The deal included a 99-year lease agreement with unlimited control over the highway and its tolls, dependent on traffic volume; however, the government maintains the right to build a transport system within the highway right-of-way. It is today described as a "value generating monster" and "cash cow" for SNC-Lavalin, and one of the "worst financial missteps" from any government in Ontario's history.

When purchased, the highway travelled from the junction of Highway 403 in Mississauga to Markham Road in Markham. Extensions westward to the QEW and eastward to Highway 7 and Brock Road in Pickering were constructed by the corporation, as mandated in the lease agreement.
The western extension, from Highway 403 southwest to the QEW, was not part of the original Highway 407 concept in 1987; rather, the corridor was originally intended to connect the Hamilton and Mississauga sections of Highway 403. Highway 407 was originally slated to assume the temporary routing for Highway 403 along the Mississauga-Oakville boundary to end at the QEW. However, the Bob Rae led Ontario government altered these plans in 1995, and the corporation constructed this section quickly upon obtaining the lease. Sections opened throughout the middle of 2001: between Neyagawa Boulevard and Highway 403 on June 17; between Bronte Road and Neyagawa Boulevard on June 29; between Dundas Street and Bronte Road on July 18; and between the Freeman Interchange and Dundas Street on July 30. In the east, a final extension between Markham Road and Highway 7 opened a month later on August 30.

Highway 407 East project 

Phase 1 was opened on June 20, 2016, consisting of a  extension to Harmony Road in Oshawa, as well as the  Highway 412. The extension was free of tolls until February 1, 2017. Phase 2A, which opened on January 2, 2018, added a  extension to Taunton Road at the future Highway 418 interchange. Phase 2B, which opened on December 9, 2019, added a  extension to Highway 35 and Highway 115, as well as the  Highway 418.

An environmental assessment (EA) to analyze the proposed extension was undertaken in the early 2000s. The assessment also included studies of the two north–south connectors. A preferred route was announced in June 2007, and the EA was completed in June 2009. On March 6, 2007, as part of the FLOW initiative, the Government of Canada and the Province of Ontario confirmed the extension of the 407 to Highway 35 and Highway 115 in Clarington, including the connector highways, with an announced completion date of 2013.
On January 27, 2009, the provincial government announced that the extension would be a tolled highway but owned by the province and with tolls set by the province. The announcement also indicated that the province expected to issue a Request for Proposals later in the year.
The contract, which is valued at $1.6 billion and includes construction and operation of the highway, was eventually awarded to the same consortium that owns 407 ETR.

On June 9, 2010, the MTO approved the extension as far east as Simcoe Street in Oshawa, announcing plans to phase construction of the extension. Local residents and politicians rejected the plan, as had happened with the section between McCowan Road and Markham Road. A motion was proposed in the Ontario Legislature to build the full extension in one project, but failed to pass. Instead, a compromise was issued on March 10, 2011: the first phase would extend Highway 407 to Harmony Road in Oshawa by 2015, including Highway 412; the second phase would then complete the extension to Highway 35 / 115 by 2020, including Highway 418. This timeline was confirmed by Premier Dalton McGuinty on May 24, 2012, and construction began in the first quarter of 2013.

In early December 2015, it was announced that contractor delays would push the opening of the first phase from December 18 to the spring of 2016.
The extension did not open until the morning of June 20, 2016, in the last hours of Spring 2016.

The final portion was originally projected to be completed in 2020. Unlike when the extension originally opened, tolling started immediately on the final portion. The highway now extends east to Ontario Highway 115, providing more options for people living in and around Peterborough to get into Toronto and the western part of the Greater Toronto Area.

Highway widening
Between 2018 and 2019, Highway 407 was widened between Markham Road and Brock Road. The first project, widening the highway to 6 lanes between York-Durham Line and Brock Road, began in Spring 2018 and was completed in August 2018. The second project, which widened the highway to 8 lanes between Markham Road and York-Durham Line, was completed in September 2019.

Controversies 

Highway 407 ETR has been the subject of several controversies over its two decades of existence.

Privatization 
The privatization of the road, the toll rate increases, and the 99-year lease period have been widely criticized.

 The original plan was for the tolls to end after the construction cost was paid off, probably after about 35 years; there is no indication that the private owners will eliminate the tolls.
 Although Premier Mike Harris promised that tolls would not rise by more than 30 percent, they have risen by over 200 percent by 2015, from about 10 cents to over 30 cents per kilometre.
 There have been criticisms and lawsuits arising from plate denial issues.
 Another criticism is that taxpayers did not receive a fair price for their highway: In 2002, just three years after the original sale for C$3.1 billion, Macquarie Infrastructure Group, an Australian investment firm, estimated that the highway was worth four times the original price. By 2019, the estimated value had risen to C$30 billion.

 Both the length of the lease, and the fact that the road is controlled by private corporations, mean that decisions about the road and the tolls are less accountable to the public. The Harris government failed to put any restrictions on toll increases (as long as the road attracted a certain volume of cars). As a result, commuters in the densely-populated Toronto area will have no protection against ever-rising tolls on this key highway during the entire 99-year span of the lease.

Safety concerns and PEO report 
Cost-savings measures and the ensuing safety concerns resulted in an independent Ontario Provincial Police investigation shortly before the opening of the freeway.
An expert panel of engineers, assembled by the Professional Engineers Ontario, released a report outlining concerns regarding the decreased loop ramp radii and a lack of protective guardrail at sharp curves, in addition to the lack of a concrete median barrier to separate the opposite directions of travel. However, it was also argued that the large grass median was sufficient to prevent cross-over collisions, given that Highway 410 has a similar median.

Toll rate approval
The Ontario provincial government has quarrelled with 407 ETR over toll rates and customer service, but is largely tied down by the lease contract. On February 2, 2004, the government delivered notice to 407 ETR that they are considered to be in default of their contract because of 407 ETR's decision to raise toll rates without first obtaining provincial clearance. The court's initial decision sided with 407 ETR: on July 10, 2004, an independent arbitrator affirmed that 407 ETR has the ability to raise toll rates without first consulting the government. The government filed an appeal of this decision but was overruled by an Ontario Superior Court decision released on January 6, 2005; however, a subsequent ruling by the Ontario Court of Appeal on June 13, 2005, granted the government permission to appeal the decision.

The government also faced off against 407 ETR in court regarding plate denial around this time.

The public has accused the 407 ETR of predatory billing practices, including false billing and continued plate denial after bankruptcy. In 2016, after a 4-year legal battle, consumers won an $8 million class action lawsuit.

Comparative toll rates 
The 407 ETR and Cobequid Pass Toll Highway (Trans Canada Highway in Nova Scotia) are the only two toll highways (not counting toll bridges on highways) in Canada.

Some other toll rates are:
New York State Niagara Thruway, exit 1 to exit 20B, approx. 30 km, US$1 cash, about $1.33 CAD, or about $0.044 per km (2019)
Cobequid Pass Toll Highway in Nova Scotia, flat rate $4 cash, for approximately 25 km of highway, or about $0.16 per km (2019)
Chicago Skyway $0.28 per km (2012)
Fort Bend Parkway Toll Road in Texas $0.13 per km (2012)
I-25 HOV Express Lanes in Colorado  $0.357 per km (2012)

Future 

The future town of Seaton is currently under development with the release of development lands in Durham north of the Gatineau Hydro Corridor and west of Brock Road. This development will include the future Pickering Airport, slated for construction in 2020. Interchanges with future extensions of Rossland Road (at the current North Road overpass, near Whitevale) and Whites Road (which is currently Sideline 26) will be built as part of the large road network planned for the development.

Exit list

See also 
Private highway
Maryland Route 200, a similar toll road in Maryland, United States.

References

External links 

Official links
 , privately operated section
 , publicly operated section
407 East Extension Environmental Assessment
407 East Phase 1 webpage
Highway 407 Act, 1998
Highway 407 Safety Review Committee report (archived copy)

Other links
Video of Highway 407 eastbound from Burlington to Vaughan
Video of Highway 407 eastbound from Vaughan to Oshawa
Highway 407 at OntHighways.com

Toll roads in Canada
07
Proposed roads in Canada
Public–private partnership projects in Canada